Gephyrota virescens, is a species of spider of the genus Gephyrota. It is endemic to Sri Lanka.

See also
 List of Philodromidae species

References

Philodromidae
Endemic fauna of Sri Lanka
Spiders of Asia
Spiders described in 1906